Urusov/Ouroussoff  and Urusova/Ouroussoff  (feminine) is a Russian princely family of Nogai origins (from turkic urus, "russian")

Famous members

 Andrey Urusov (also known as Kasim-Murza, 1590–1647) — 17th century Novgorod military chief, the son of Satyi-Murza, founder of this branch of Tatar Princes' family
 Alexander Ivanovich Urusov (1843–1900) - Russian lawyer and literary critic 
 Alexander Mikhaylovich Urusov (1766–1853) — Moscow Court Office's president, Alexander Ivanovich Urusov's grandfather
 Vasily Urusov (d. 1741) — Russian Rear admiral, the founder of the Russian Caspian flotilla
 Lev Vladimirovich Urusov (1877–1933) — Russian diplomat
 Sergey Nikolayevich Urusov (1816–1883) — Russian politician
 Sergey Semyonovich Urusov (1827–1897) — Russian chess player
 Sergey Dmitriyevich Urusov (1862–1937) — Russian politician
 Nicolai Vladimirovich Ouroussoff (born October 3, 1962) - Architecture critic for The New York Times from 2004 until June 2011.
 Sofya Urusova, Princess Sofya Aleksandrovna Urusova (1804–1889)

References

Russian-language surnames